Raymond van Barneveld (born 20 April 1967) is a Dutch  professional darts player who plays in Professional Darts Corporation (PDC) events. Nicknamed Barney, although originally known as The Man, he is one of the most successful darts players in history. Van Barneveld is a five-time World Darts Champion (four-time BDO and one-time PDC), a two-time UK Open Champion and a former winner of the Las Vegas Desert Classic, the Grand Slam of Darts and the Premier League. He is also a twice-winner of the World Masters and the World Darts Trophy, and a three-time winner of the International Darts League, the Dutch Open and the WDF World Cup Singles event.

Van Barneveld won the PDC World Cup of Darts four times (once with Co Stompé and three times with Michael van Gerwen) and the WDF World Cup Pairs once (with Vincent van der Voort), all whilst representing the Netherlands. He also won the PDC World Pairs with Roland Scholten.

From January to June 2008, he was the world's number one ranked player. His victory over Phil Taylor in the 2007 PDC World Championship final, added to his four previous BDO World Championships brought him level with Eric Bristow as a five-time world champion; he is one of only three players in darts history to achieve this.

He is one of the most successful Dutch darts players to date, and has had a significant effect in raising the popularity of darts in the Netherlands. He is naturally left-handed but throws darts with his right hand.

In November 2018, Van Barneveld announced his intention to retire from darts after the 2020 PDC World Darts Championship. On 28 March 2019, following a 7–1 defeat to Michael van Gerwen in his final Premier League match, he announced his retirement with immediate effect, but reversed his decision the following day. He retired again following his first-round exit from the 2020 PDC World Darts Championship. In February 2021, 14 months after retiring, he regained his professional tour card after qualifying at the PDC's Q-School.

BDO career

1984–1990: Early career
Van Barneveld began participating in competitive events around the Netherlands since 1984 when he was 17 years old. During that year he won his first tournament, which was the Rotterdam Open. From there onwards, Van Barneveld was considered among his compatriots as a future potential. In the following years he joined the international darts circuit, achieving further success reaching the semi-finals of the 1987 Belgian Open and reaching the semi-finals in the 1988 Dutch Open. In September 1990 he participated in the WDF Europe Cup singles where he lost in the quarter-finals to Phil Taylor.

1991–1997: First World final
Van Barneveld's World Championship debut was at the 1991 Embassy World Championship at the Lakeside Country Club. His debut at the World Championship however was short-lived as he was comfortably beaten 3–0 by Keith Sullivan of Australia.

He started to make some progress on the British Darts Organisation circuit in the early 1990s, reaching the quarter-finals of the Belgian Open in September 1990 and the German Open in March 1991. His first semi-final came at the Swiss Open in June 1991.

He failed to qualify for the World Championship in 1992, but returned to Lakeside in 1993, which would be the last time that a unified World Championship would be staged. Van Barneveld served notice of his potential when he hit a 170 checkout to go 2 sets to 1 in front against John Lowe during their second-round match, but Lowe eventually won the match 3–2. Lowe went on to win the 1993 World Championship. Shortly after the 1993 World Final, the top players in the World Darts Council (WDC, now the PDC) were suspended and later banned from BDO tournaments.

Van Barneveld continued to make progress in the BDO Open events in 1994 after the split. Despite failing to qualify for the 1994 BDO World Championship, he reached the quarter-finals of both Dutch Open and Berlin Open, the semi-final at the Belgium Open and his first and only final in a major in 1994, at the Finnish Open where he lost to Andy Fordham.

He continued his good run of form into the 1995 World Championship by beating Les Wallace, Dave Askew, Colin Monk and Martin Adams to reach his first World Final. Van Barneveld's run to the final would eventually come to an end as he was defeated 6–3 by Welshman Richie Burnett.

1998–2006: Four World titles
After second round exits in 1996 and 1997 Championships, Van Barneveld claimed his first world title in the 1998 World Championship in a World Final grudge match meeting against Richie Burnett. This time Van Barneveld was the victor, edging Burnett 6–5 in a game which is often considered to be one of the greatest finals of all time having reached 5–5 in sets Van Barneveld finally took the title by winning the final set 4–2 in legs on double 8.

He successfully defended the trophy the year later by the same winning margin as the previous year, this time against Ronnie Baxter. This made him only the second player in the tournament's history to have launched a successful defence of his title; the other being Eric Bristow. Martin Adams and Glen Durrant would later also achieve this feat. In November 1999, Van Barneveld, the then 2-time reigning Lakeside World Champion, took on Phil Taylor, the then 7-time World Champion and reigning PDC world champion, at the Wembley Conference Centre. It was a legs match with a 60-minute clock ticking down to zero, with a short break at around the halfway stage. Van Barneveld lost the match 21–10.

Van Barneveld exited in the first round of the World Championships in 2000, crashing out to Chris Mason, who averaged 100 and ended Van Barneveld's hopes of a hat-trick of titles, as well as avenging a semi final loss from the previous year.

Van Barneveld lost in the quarter-finals in 2001 (5–4 to Ted Hankey) and 2002 (5–3 to Mervyn King) before returning to the final in 2003. He clinched his third world title by beating Ritchie Davies of Wales 6–3.

Van Barneveld's 2004 campaign ended in the semi-finals, when Andy Fordham recovered from being 3–0 and 4–2 behind, to beat Van Barneveld 5–4.

A fourth title followed in 2005. He never dropped a set in the first three rounds as he beat Gary Anderson, Mike Veitch and Vincent van der Voort. A 5–3 semi-final win over Darryl Fitton and 6–2 triumph over Martin Adams of England in the final brought him that fourth title.

Van Barneveld reached his sixth final in 2006, and was aiming to equal Bristow's record of five BDO world titles. However, his opponent, 21-year-old fellow countryman Jelle Klaasen, prevailed 7–5.

He has also won the prestigious Winmau World Masters title twice: once in 2001 when he recorded a win in the final over Jarkko Komula of Finland and again in 2005 when he beat Göran Klemme in the final. Other major darts tournaments that he has won at least twice include The World Darts Trophy and The International Darts League.

PDC career

Switch to PDC
After playing in the BDO for twenty years, winning four World Championships, Van Barneveld announced his move from the BDO to the PDC on 15 February 2006. He cited his reasons as wanting a greater challenge, and regularly playing against players like Phil Taylor. Having started from scratch in the rankings, within twelve months he had reached world number two and became World Champion.

2006 season: UK Open title
His PDC debut came in the 2006 Premier League competition. He won his first match 8–1 against Baxter. On 23 March, he hit his first televised nine dart finish and faced Taylor later in the same night, fighting back for a 7–7 draw. The rematch came on Van Barneveld's 39th birthday, but this time Taylor won the deciding leg for an 8–6 victory. Van Barneveld lost in a surprise 11–3 semi-final defeat in the Premier League to fellow Dutchman Roland Scholten.

Van Barneveld then started a successful run with a 13–5 final victory over Colin Lloyd in the final of the International Darts League for his 11th BDO Grand Slam tournament. He won his first major PDC title in June by beating Barrie Bates in the final of the UK Open at the Reebok Stadium, Bolton. Earlier in the day, he beat Taylor in the quarter-finals, accomplishing one of his dreams which he announced after switching to the PDC. Van Barneveld beat Taylor again just weeks later in the semi-finals of the 2006 Las Vegas Desert Classic. He lost 6–3 to Canadian John Part in the final the following day.

In September 2006, soon after losing to 17-year-old Michael van Gerwen in the first round of the 2006 World Darts Trophy, Van Barneveld acknowledged that he needed to work on his finishing throws, and he made alterations to his game. He changed his darts and began using the "stacking" technique used by Taylor. The darts used were a gram lighter than his old ones and cost the equivalent of £1 from a local store in the Netherlands. Although he played well in the 2006 World Grand Prix, he lost to Phil Taylor in the second round.

2007 season: 5th World title

Taylor and Van Barneveld met again in the 2007 PDC World Championship final, in a match which Taylor later described as the best final he had been involved in. From three sets down, Van Barneveld came back to beat Taylor 7–6 in the sudden death leg in one of the greatest darts matches of all time to match Bristow's record of five world titles. In February 2007, Van Barneveld won the 2007 Masters of Darts tournament by beating Peter Manley 7–0 in sets in the final with a 107 three dart average. 

In the 2007 Premier League Darts, he never fared as well as he did in 2006, losing to Taylor twice, Dennis Priestley and Lloyd in the group section. He finished second but lost an error-filled encounter 11–10 to Terry Jenkins in the semi-final.

Van Barneveld made amends for his Premier League campaign by inflicting one of Taylor's heaviest defeats (11–4) in the quarter-final of the 2007 UK Open and went on to successfully defend his title beating Lloyd 11–4 in the semi-final and Van der Voort in the final 16–8. In doing this, Van Barneveld became the first person to successfully defend the UK Open crown. A month later, he continued his surge of major titles by beating Terry Jenkins 13 legs to 6 in the final of the 2007 Las Vegas Desert Classic. Van Barneveld's dream of winning the five major ranking PDC tournament titles in 2007 – the World Championship, UK Open, Las Vegas Desert Classic, World Matchplay and the World Grand Prix ended when he was defeated by Adrian Lewis 16 legs to 14 in the quarter finals of the World Matchplay in Blackpool.

His haul of titles in the PDC continued to grow since his switch. In addition to his four major titles (the World Championship, two UK Open Championships and the Vegas Desert Classic) – he has added eleven non-televised PDC Pro Tour titles (five UK Open Regionals and six Players Championships).

2008 season
2008 proved to be Van Barneveld's most barren year thus far in the PDC in terms of success, with him not winning a major tournament. His defence of the World Championship crown was seriously thwarted by a bout of flu. He managed to win his first two matches comfortably, although he nearly had to retire during his second-round match due to breathing problems. He was defeated by Kevin Painter in the 3rd round by 4 sets to 2. Following this, he reached the semi-finals of the 2008 Premier League Darts, but was defeated for the third consecutive year at this stage of the tournament, defeated by James Wade. He was also knocked out of the early stages of the US Open, the Las Vegas Desert Classic by Alan Tabern and in the semi-finals of the UK Open by Gary Mawson, after having defeated rival Taylor by 10 legs to 9 a round earlier. He was also defeated in the quarter finals of the World Matchplay by Wayne Mardle, despite leading 12 legs to 7 at one stage. However, Van Barneveld did regain some form in the World Grand Prix reaching the final of the tournament, before being defeated by Taylor by 6 sets to 2. He then lost to Lewis in the quarter-finals of the inaugural European Darts Championship in November losing by 9 legs to 2.

2009 season: 8th World final
Van Barneveld threw another televised Nine-dart finish in the 2009 World Championship in his quarter-final match against fellow Dutchman Klaasen on 2 January 2009. Van Barneveld hit two maximum 180s before nailing treble 20, treble 19 and double 12 to complete his nine-darter in the second leg of the sixth set.
The feat earned Van Barneveld £20,000 – the bonus had not been won since Taylor's nine-darter at the UK Open against Jamie Harvey – as he became the first player to throw a perfect leg in the PDC World Championship. Van Barneveld went on to win the match 5–1, with a 161 finish, and then won his semi-final against Wade. However, he lost 7-1 to Taylor in the final. As a result of his failure to defend the £100,000 he won at the 2007 World Championship (his runner-up position earned him £60,000) he dropped from 2nd to 3rd in the PDC Order of Merit.

Van Barneveld threw his fourth nine dart finish in the Blue Square UK Open West Midlands Regional on 29 March 2009 in the third round against Kirk Shepherd. Barney only earned £400 for this as Mervyn King snapped up the £4,000 bonus on 28 March 2009 at the Coventry Players Championship with a nine dart finish.

In the 2009 Las Vegas Desert Classic, Barney returned to form, losing narrowly to Phil Taylor 13–11 in the final. After the game, Barney took the microphone from Sky Sports presenter Dave Clark and gave a speech about Phil Taylor.

After his quarter final World Matchplay defeat by Terry Jenkins, Van Barneveld took another sabbatical from darts. He declined entries for the Championship of Darts and the South African Masters. There was speculation Van Barneveld was considering retiring from the sport, but he stated after his first-round win in the 2009 World Grand Prix over Alan Tabern that he was suffering from diabetes and his absence was in order to get fit and healthy and going to the gym. He also attributed the diabetes towards his form in major tournaments. Van Barneveld reached the World Grand Prix final for the second successive year, but again lost to Taylor, this time by 6 sets to 3.

On 28 December 2009, he hit another nine-darter in the second round of the PDC World Championship against Brendan Dolan, becoming the first player to hit two nine-dart finishes in the PDC World Championship. He went on to reach the semi finals before losing 6–5 to Simon Whitlock. He also lost the third-place play-off 10–8 in legs to Mark Webster.

2010 season
In the 2010 World Championship, Simon Whitlock defeated Van Barneveld 6–5 in a close semi final encounter.

On 29 April 2010, Van Barneveld hit another nine-darter against Terry Jenkins at the 2010 Whyte & Mackay Premier League Darts in Aberdeen. This came during a poor Premier League campaign in which he only finished in sixth place. During the Premier League, Barney said that he was suffering from personal problems back home and claimed that he and his family were being blackmailed. He failed to qualify for the 2010 UK Open, having only entered one of the eight qualifying events (only players who entered three or more events were eligible to qualify).

Van Barneveld returned to top form at the 2010 World Matchplay. In the first round against Denis Ovens on 17 July 2010, Van Barneveld hit another nine-darter. After then defeating Alan Tabern and Co Stompé, Van Barneveld defeated former World Matchplay champion, James Wade, by 17–8 in the semi final. In the final, Phil Taylor defeated Van Barneveld 18–12.

2011 season
At the 2011 World Championship, he lost in the quarter-finals to an in form Gary Anderson.

The 2011 Premier League saw a slight return of form after he hit 4 100+ finishes and defeated Simon Whitlock 8–3 with a 100.15 average. He went on to win his next match against Adrian Lewis 8–6, before losing to Phil Taylor in their match, 8–3. In week 6, he defeated Mark Webster 8–4 with a high average of 100.98  and also hit a 161 checkout. He went on to defeat Gary Anderson 8–5 in week 7 with an average of 101.44. Van Barneveld finished the league phase in second place behind Taylor, but then lost in the semi final to Anderson, which was the fifth time in six years that Van Barneveld had reached the Premier League semi finals without getting into the final.

The 2011 UK Open saw Barneveld progress to the fifth round of the competition where he was defeated 9–1 by an on form Wes Newton who was eventual runner-up.

On the day of his first-round match in the 2011 World Matchplay Barney lost his darts. He contacted his sponsors with a S.O.S which meant they had to contact the closest supplier to deliver a new set for him. He received the set with no problems and used them to defeat Steve Brown 10–3 averaging 95.56.

2012 season: Grand Slam of Darts win
Van Barneveld was the victim of one of the biggest upsets in PDC World Championship history in 2012. He lost 0–3 in the first round to world number 85, James Richardson, winning just four legs during the match. He teamed up with Vincent van der Voort for the 2012 PDC World Cup of Darts to try to defend the title Van Barneveld won with Co Stompé in 2010. Together they enjoyed comfortable victories over Austria and Northern Ireland to set up a semi-final clash with the Australian pair of Paul Nicholson and Simon Whitlock. Van Barneveld beat Nicholson 4–0 in their singles match, but this was the only point the Dutch won as they relinquished their crown in a 5–1 defeat.

Van Barneveld was a Sky Sports pick for the Premier League. During the tournament he produced his then highest ever televised average of 112.28 whilst defeating Kevin Painter 8–6. He went into the final round of matches knowing a win over James Wade would secure him a place in the play-offs, but could only manage to draw the match 7–7 to finish 5th in the table, out of the play-off places on leg difference.

Van Barneveld won the UK Open Qualifier 5 by beating Andy Smith 6–3 in the final, after earlier overcoming Simon Whitlock and Terry Jenkins. He also hit a nine-dart finish in his third round match against Michael Barnard. He completed a weekend double by winning Event 6 a day later after defeating Ian White 6–2 in the final. In the UK Open itself, he beat Jelle Klaasen and Andy Hamilton to reach the last 16. In this match he played Peter Wright and looked to be exiting the tournament as Van Barneveld trailed 8–6, with his opponent on a 138 finish to win the match. Wright hit treble 20, single 18 and required a single 20 to leave double tops when he returned. However, he hit another treble 20 to bust his score, and Van Barneveld went on to take a 9–8 victory. He played Dave Chisnall in the quarter-finals and never recovered from a poor start in which he lost the opening five legs and succumbed 10–5. However, Van Barneveld gained revenge over Chisnall in the final of the European Tour Event 3 in Düsseldorf, by defeating him 6–4 and claimed his first European Tour title.

At the World Matchplay Van Barneveld lost to Terry Jenkins 13–10 in the last 16. In September, he broke his highest televised average for the second time this year by averaging 113.04 in a 6–1 win against Jenkins at the European Championship. He went on to the quarter-finals, where he lost 10–8 to Kim Huybrechts.

In November 2012, Van Barneveld won his first major tournament in over five years at the non-ranking Grand Slam of Darts. He beat Mark Walsh 5–0 in his first group match, before losing 5–4 to BDO World Champion Christian Kist in his second. However, a 5–2 win over Wayne Jones from 2–0 down was enough to see him qualify for the knockout stage, where he defeated fellow Dutchman Wesley Harms 10–4 in the last 16, avenged his earlier loss to Kist in the quarter-finals by winning 16–10, and beat Andy Hamilton 16–10 in the semi-finals to set up an all-Dutch clash with Grand Prix champion Michael van Gerwen. Van Barneveld was never behind in the final and although he missed three chances to win 16–13, he sealed the title in the following leg with an 11-darter against the throw. His win was later named the best PDC Televised Performance of the Year.

After all 33 ProTour events of 2012 had been played, Van Barneveld finished fourth on the Order of Merit to qualify for the Players Championship Finals where he lost 6–5 to Steve Beaton in the first round.

2013 season
Van Barneveld began the 2013 World Championship by throwing the sixth highest average in the history of the tournament in his first round 3–0 defeat of Michael Smith. In a match that lasted only 18 minutes he averaged 108.31 as he never looked in danger of exiting the tournament at the first hurdle for the second successive year. He beat Brendan Dolan 4–1, Gary Anderson 4–0 and Simon Whitlock 5–1 to reach the semi-finals where he faced Phil Taylor. Before the match Van Barneveld commented that he wasn't scared of Taylor and wanted to face him rather than Taylor's quarter-final opponent Andy Hamilton. Van Barneveld was 5–1 down in the match and almost staged a fightback as he won three successive sets to trail only 5–4. However, Taylor won the next set by three legs to one to take the match. The pair were involved in an angry confrontation after the match. Taylor reacted angrily when Van Barneveld pulled him back after their handshake, with both men being escorted away separately by security staff. Van Barneveld stated later that he was only trying to congratulate Taylor in a sportsmanlike way and give him a hug. Taylor apologised for his behaviour a day later.

In his third World Cup of Darts and first with Michael van Gerwen, the Dutch pair suffered a shock in the last 16 when they were beaten 5–3 by the Finnish duo of Jani Haavisto and Jarkko Komula. Van Barneveld was never out of the top four in the Premier League during all 14 weeks of the league phase. He won 10 out of his 16 games to finish second in the table which set up a semi-final meeting with Taylor against whom he had lost 7–3 and drawn with 6–6 in their two league clashes. From level at 3–3 in the semi-final, Taylor stormed away to win 8–4 to deny Van Barneveld his first Premier League final. Van Barneveld reached the final of the non-ranking Dubai Masters thanks to 10–6 and 11–5 wins over Adrian Lewis and James Wade. He faced Van Gerwen and was beaten 7–11. Van Barneveld defeated defending champion Robert Thornton in the last 16 of the 2013 UK Open and survived one match dart from Ronnie Baxter in the quarter-finals to win 10–9. His semi-final against Andy Hamilton went into a last leg decider, with Van Barneveld missing a total of six darts for the match to lose 10–9. He lost in the second round of the European Championship and World Matchplay to Thornton and Justin Pipe respectively. Van Barneveld put his bad form behind him in October by securing his first ranking title of 2013 at the tenth Players Championship of the year with a 6–3 defeat of Peter Wright in the final. However, less than a week later in the second round of the World Grand Prix he was beaten 3–0 by Michael van Gerwen in 21 minutes. In the defence of his Grand Slam of Darts title he beat Ricky Evans and Tony O'Shea, but lost his final group game against Mervyn King to be knocked out of the competition on leg difference.

2014 season: Premier League glory
Van Barneveld took a 3–2 lead in sets over Mark Webster in the third round of the 2014 World Championship, but afterward exited the tournament losing 4–3. He had a poor run of form in the UK Open Qualifiers to be placed 66th on the Order of Merit meaning he entered the tournament in the first-round stage. Van Barneveld had four comfortable victories to reach the fifth round where he was beaten 9–2 by Adrian Lewis. He produced some of his most consistent darts in years during the Premier League as he remained unbeaten for 12 matches during the season to finish second in the table. In the semi-finals he secured his first win over Phil Taylor in the tournament after 21 attempts, having fought back from 4–1 down to triumph 8–5. It was the first time he had advanced beyond the semi-finals of the event, after losing at this stage in six previous years. Van Barneveld then won four successive legs from 5–5 in the final against Michael van Gerwen and went on to win the title 10–6. His finishing proved to be the difference between him and the rest of the nine players as throughout the 18 matches his checkout percentage was 50.22, seven percent higher than Simon Whitlock in second place. Afterwards, Van Barneveld revealed he had received therapy for depression in January due to the monotony of travelling and playing in events every week.

At the World Cup of Darts, Van Barneveld and Van Gerwen produced a 117.88 average in their doubles decider against Northern Ireland to whitewash them 4–0 and meet England's Taylor and Lewis in the final. Van Gerwen defeated Taylor 4–0 and Van Barneveld recorded the same scoreline against Lewis. Van Gerwen went into his singles match versus Lewis knowing a win would earn the Dutch pair the title and he did so with a 4–2 success. Early on in his second round match against Mervyn King at the World Grand Prix, Van Barneveld was visibly struggling with a back problem but battled to trail 2–1 in sets. However, in the fourth set he missed 30 starting doubles and began throwing at the bullseye. King duly won the match, with Van Barneveld issuing an apology to the PDC and the television viewers for giving up. At the next major event, the European Championship, Van Barneveld wore glasses during a match for the first time in his career and explained after his 6–4 first round win over Simon Whitlock that his diabetes can occasionally blur his vision. He won through to the semi-finals, but was beaten 11–6 by Van Gerwen who threw a nine darter during the game. The pair also met in the next televised event the Masters, in a first round match which went to a deciding leg with Van Gerwen leaving 32 after nine darts and edging Van Barneveld 10–9. He lost to newcomer Keegan Brown 10–7 in the last 16 of the Grand Slam and was drawn to face Van Gerwen in the first round again this time at the Players Championship Finals where he was defeated 6–2.

2015 season
Van Barneveld decided not to wear his glasses in the first round of the 2015 World Championship and took out finishes of 167 and 170 in beating Rowby-John Rodriguez 3–0. He was then involved in three successive matches in which there was never more than a set between Van Barneveld and his opponent as he edged past Jamie Caven 4–3, Adrian Lewis 4–3 (despite Lewis hitting a 9-darter and missing one match dart) and Stephen Bunting 5–4. In the Bunting match he returned from a break after the fourth set with his glasses on explaining afterwards that the board was looking blurry. Van Barneveld looked to have got himself back into his semi-final meeting with Phil Taylor when he recovered from 2–0 down to draw level, but his lengthy previous matches seemed to take effect as he could not win another set to be defeated 6–2. At the Masters he knocked out newly crowned world champion Gary Anderson 11–6 in the semi-finals, but was beaten by a reversal of this scoreline against Michael van Gerwen in the final.

He eliminated reigning champion Adrian Lewis 9–3 at the UK Open, but then lost a televised match against Peter Wright for the first time as he was comprehensively beaten 9–1. In week seven of the Premier League, Van Barneveld defeated Taylor 7–4, despite Taylor averaging 115.80, the highest losing average in the history of televised darts. Van Barneveld survived relegation by leg difference, but then won six of his last seven matches to qualify for the play-offs. It included 7–2, 7–3 and 7–2 victories over Taylor, Van Gerwen and Lewis respectively. From 4–4 in the semi-finals against Van Gerwen, Van Barneveld won three successive legs which included missing double 12 for a nine-darter. However, Van Gerwen then took five legs on the trot and went on to win 10–8. The pair were knocked out in the semi-finals of the World Cup in a doubles match against Scotland's Anderson and Wright. He was eliminated in the first round of the World Matchplay for the first time in his career when Andy Hamilton beat him 10–7. Van Barneveld missed five championship darts in the final of the last leg of the Auckland Darts Masters to lose 11–10 against Lewis. He reached his first Pro Tour final in nearly two years at the 16th Players Championship, but lost 6–4 to Jelle Klaasen.
Van Barneveld beat Larry Butler to qualify from his group at the Grand Slam and then came past James Wade 10–7 and Mark Webster 16–12 to reach the semi-finals, where he lost 16–12 to Taylor.

2016 season

At the 2016 World Championship, Van Barneveld edged past Stephen Bunting in a final set decider for a second year in a row and then played Michael van Gerwen, who he had lost to 10 times out of 13 throughout 2015. Van Barneveld won 4–3, despite Van Gerwen averaging 105.78 which was at the time the highest to ever lose a match in the event. A third successive match went the distance in the quarter-finals after Van Barneveld recovered from a 3–0 deficit against Michael Smith. In the final set he survived one match dart from Smith and Van Barneveld won four legs in a row to move into the semi-finals where he played Adrian Lewis. This time he was 5–0 down and then won a trio of sets, but his poor start cost him as he lost 6–3. Van Barneveld finished the year seventh in the Premier League table to fail to qualify for the Play-offs for the first time since 2012. It was also his lowest position out of all of his 11 appearances at the event. The Netherlands team reached the final of the World Cup and it went to a deciding singles match in which Adrian Lewis beat Van Gerwen 4–1.

Van Barneveld was knocked out in the first round of the World Matchplay for the second successive year as Brendan Dolan won 10–7. He did not drop a set in reaching the semi-finals of the World Grand Prix as he overcame Mervyn King, Lewis and Benito van de Pas, but was defeated 4–1 by Gary Anderson. At the Grand Slam, Van Barneveld averaged over 100 in each of his three group games to top the table and then saw off the BDO's number one Glen Durrant 10–7 to play Anderson in the quarter-finals. The lead changed hands six times and Anderson closed the match with 13, 12, 11 and 11 dart legs to progress 16–13. Van Barneveld reached another quarter-final at the Players Championship Finals and he averaged 103, but Van Gerwen's 108.03 proved too strong as he won 10–5.

2017 season
Van Barneveld edged past Adrian Lewis 4–3 in the third round of the 2017 World Championship and his 5–3 victory over Phil Taylor in the quarter-finals meant that Van Barneveld had reached the semi-finals for the last three years in the event. He took the first set without reply in his quest to reach his first final since 2009. However, Michael van Gerwen then produced the best performance ever seen in a World Championship game as he hit a tournament record average of 114.05 to win 6–2. Van Barneveld averaged 109.34 himself, the highest to ever lose a World Championship match. He also had a high losing average in the quarter-finals of the UK Open as Peter Wright came from 8–7 down to win 10–8 with Van Barneveld averaging 108.10. The Netherlands won their first World Cup since 2014 by seeing off the Welsh team of Gerwyn Price and Mark Webster 3–1 in the final.

2018 season
Van Barneveld reached the quarter final of the 2018 World Championship, losing to Michael van Gerwen 5–4. He reached his first premier event final for three years at the 2018 Masters, being defeated by Van Gerwen. Partnering Van Gerwen at the 2018 PDC World Cup of Darts, the Dutch duo retained their title, beating the Scotland pair of Gary Anderson and Peter Wright.

Van Barneveld announced on 19 November that he would retire after the 2020 PDC World Darts Championship.

2019 season and retirement
Van Barneveld was eliminated in the second round of the 2019 World Championship by Darius Labanauskas. He was invited to the 2019 Premier League Darts, being eliminated after the first phase, having been bottom of the table after nine matches. Following the elimination, Van Barneveld announced his immediate retirement on 28 March, before reversing the decision a day later.

He retired following a 3–1 defeat to American Darin Young in the first round of the 2020 World Championship, a result he claimed he could "never forgive" himself for.

2021 season: Comeback 
On 23 September 2020, Van Barneveld announced his intention to compete in the PDC Q-School for 2021, reversing his decision to retire. 

He qualified for the second phase of Q-school after winning through on points before securing his two year tour card on the last day finishing 3rd on the Order of Merit.

On 27 February, Van Barneveld won his first tournament after his comeback at just the third time of asking, at the Players Championship 3 in Bolton. His 8–6 victory over Joe Cullen marked his first individual PDC title since the 2014 Premier League, and first ranking title since 2013.

2022 season
In his return to the big stage at the 2022 World Championship, van Barneveld lost 3–1 to Rob Cross in the second round. At the 2022 Grand Slam, van Barneveld reached the semi finals before losing to eventual winner  Michael Smith.

2023 season
At the 2023 World Championship, van Barneveld was whitewashed 4–0 by Gerwyn Price in the third round.

Outside of darts

In 2012, Van Barneveld, together with the seven other players who competed in the 2012 Premier League Darts recorded a charity single with Chas Hodges and his band called 'Got My Tickets for the Darts' which was written by Chas. It was released exclusively on iTunes on 18 May, the night after the play-offs at the O2 in London, where it was premiered. Proceeds from the single were donated to the Haven House Children's Hospice.
In 2017, Van Barneveld featured in the song '180 linkerbaan'  (180 left lane) by Dutch rapper Donnie (Donald Scloszkie).

Personal life
Van Barneveld lives in The Hague with his fiancée Julia. Previously, he was married to Sylvia for 25 years. They divorced in January 2019. Raymond has three children: a son, William (born 1989) and daughters Daisy (born 1992) and Patty (born 1994). In October 2009, during the World Grand Prix tournament in Ireland, Van Barneveld revealed that he had been diagnosed with type 2 diabetes that summer, and that it can affect his vision if his blood sugar level is too high. He is a supporter of ADO Den Haag.

Awards and records
Best PDC Pro Tour Player/Floor Player: 2008
PDC Nine Dart Club: *2006, *2009, *2010, -2010, *2011 (x2), -2012, -2013 *Gold Pin Badge (televised) / -Silver Pin Badge (non-televised)
PDC Televised Performance of the Year: 2013
PDC Best Newcomer: 2006
BDO Personality Award: 1998
Knights of the Order of Orange-Nassau: 1999

World Championship results

BDO
 1991: First round (lost to Keith Sullivan 0–3)
 1993: Second round (lost to John Lowe 2–3)
 1995: Runner-up (lost to Richie Burnett 3–6)
 1996: Second round (lost to Matt Clark 1–3)
 1997: Second round (lost to Les Wallace 2–3)
 1998: Winner (beat Richie Burnett 6–5)
 1999: Winner (beat Ronnie Baxter 6–5)
 2000: First round (lost to Chris Mason 1–3)
 2001: Quarter-final (lost to Ted Hankey 4–5)
 2002: Quarter-final (lost to Mervyn King 3–5)
 2003: Winner (beat Ritchie Davies 6–3)
 2004: Semi-final (lost to Andy Fordham 4–5)
 2005: Winner (beat Martin Adams 6–2)
 2006: Runner-up (lost to Jelle Klaasen 5–7)

PDC
 2007: Winner (beat Phil Taylor 7–6)
 2008: Third round (lost to Kevin Painter 2–4)
 2009: Runner-up (lost to Phil Taylor 1–7)
 2010: Semi-final (lost to Simon Whitlock 5–6); Fourth place: lost to Mark Webster 8–10 (legs)
 2011: Quarter-final (lost to Gary Anderson 1–5)
 2012: First round (lost to James Richardson 0–3)
 2013: Semi-final (lost to Phil Taylor 4–6)
 2014: Third round (lost to Mark Webster 3–4)
 2015: Semi-final (lost to Phil Taylor 2–6)
 2016: Semi-final (lost to Adrian Lewis 3–6)
 2017: Semi-final (lost to Michael van Gerwen 2–6)
 2018: Quarter-final (lost to Michael van Gerwen 4–5)
 2019: Second round (lost to Darius Labanauskas 2–3)
 2020: First round (lost to Darin Young 1–3)
 2022: Second round (lost to Rob Cross 1–3)
 2023: Third round (lost to Gerwyn Price 0–4)

Career finals

BDO major finals: 17 (14 titles, 3 runners-up)

PDC major finals: 15 (6 titles, 9 runners-up)

PDC world series finals: 5 (5 runners-up)

Independent major finals: 1 (1 title)

PDC team finals: 7 (6 titles, 1 runner-up)

Career statistics

BDO

PDC

PDC European Tour

Nine-dart finishes

In January 2009, in the quarter-finals of the 2009 PDC World Darts Championship, Van Barneveld became the first player in professional darts to hit a nine darter at the PDC World Darts Championship.

High averages

Notes

References

External links

Official website  (archived)
Raymond van Barneveld on modusdarts.tv
Raymond van Barneveld on PDC News

Raymond van Barneveld "Barney" best tribute video 1998, 99, 2003 and 2005 World Championship wins on YouTube

1967 births
Living people
Dutch darts players
Sportspeople from The Hague
PDC world darts champions
Professional Darts Corporation current tour card holders
Knights of the Order of Orange-Nassau
British Darts Organisation players
BDO world darts champions
UK Open champions
Grand Slam of Darts champions
Premier League Darts champions
Las Vegas Desert Classic champions
Darts players who have thrown televised nine-dart games
PDC World Cup of Darts Dutch championship team